Astrocartography (called "astrogeography" in Europe in earlier years) is a method of locational astrology, by which specific geographic locations are associated with expected differences in personal life circumstances.

Technique
Developed and popularized by American astrologer Jim Lewis, astrocartography is a locational astrology system that focuses on elements of the natal chart, by identifying these factors on a world "Astro*Carto*Graphy Map."  Lewis' Astro*Carto*Graphy maps show all locations on the earth where planets were "angular" (rising, setting, on the zenith or nadir) at the moment of an event like a person's birth. An "angular" planet is one that is conjunct one of these four angles (Ascendant, Descendant, MC or IC). These locations are displayed in the form of lines on the Astro*Carto*Graphy world map.

Application
These maps are used by 'astro-cartographers' to counsel their clients on plans for relocation or travel.  As such, they are part of a general branch of astrology known as locational astrology or "relocation astrology".  Other techniques used for this purpose include local space mapping, relocated birth charts, and city incorporation charts.

A*C*G Map Sources & Variations
Lewis created the trademark "Astro*Carto*Graphy" to refer to his map and granted licenses to three companies to customize his authorized maps and accompanying material: Astro Numeric Services (USA), Equinox Astrology (UK and Australia) and Astrodata (Switzerland). Other similar maps were developed showing additional locational factors Lewis rejected. One example is the "Astrolocality Map" developed by Astro Computing Services of San Diego. In addition to the A*C*G lines showing conjunctions to the angles, this version includes planetary squares, trines, and other aspects.

See also
Astrology software

References

Further reading
 The Astro*Carto*Graphy Book of Maps, (1981) with Ariel Guttman, Llewellyn Publications
 The Psychology of Astro*Carto*Graphy (Contemporary Astrology), (posthumous), by Jim Lewis and  Kenneth Irving.  .
 From Here to There - An Astrologer's Guide to Astromapping, an anthology of articles by locational astrologers edited by Martin Jay Davis.  Published by the Wessex Astrologer. .
 Astro*Carto*Graphy - Explanatory Handbook, (1976) by Jim Lewis.

Astrology by type